This is a list of supermarket chains in Malaysia.

Current supermarket chains

 AEON Group
 AEON
 AEON MaxValu Prime
 AEON BiG (formerly Carrefour)
 Ben's Independent Grocer
 Econsave
 Emart (East Malaysia)
 GCH Retail
 Cold Storage
 Giant Hypermarket
 HeroMarket
 Isetan
 Jaya Grocer
 Lulu Hypermarket
 Lotus's
 Mercato
 Mydin
 SABASUN HYPErRUNCIT (Harga Muroh Sokmo)
 NSK Grocer (operated by NSK Trade City)
 Parkson
 Redtick (serving East Malaysia)
 Servay Hypermarket (East Malaysia)
 Sam's Groceria
 SOGO
 TF Value Mart
 The Store
 Village Grocer
 99 Speedmart

Former supermarket chains
 Carrefour (taken over by the Æon group to become Æon Big)
 Jaya Supermarket
 Tesco and Tesco Extra (Now known as Lotus's)
 Makro (became Tesco Extra and now Lotus's)
 Tops

References

Malaysia
Supermarkets of Malaysia
Supermarket chains